Transcriptional activator protein Pur-beta is a protein that in humans is encoded by the PURB gene.

This gene product is a sequence-specific, single-stranded DNA-binding protein. It binds preferentially to the single strand of the purine-rich element termed PUR, which is present at origins of replication and in gene flanking regions in a variety of eukaryotes from yeasts through humans. 

Thus, it is implicated in the control of both DNA replication and transcription. Deletion of this gene has been associated with myelodysplastic syndrome and acute myelogenous leukemia.

References

Further reading